Danke may refer to:

"Danke" (song), a 1961 hymn by Martin Gotthard Schneider
"Danke", a 2006 song by Xavier Naidoo
 (born 1962), Communist Party of China official
Katlego Danke (born 1978), South African actress

See also
Dangke, an Indonesian cheese
Danka (disambiguation)